Sarah Calati (born 13 October 1986) is an Australian wheelchair tennis player. She competed for Australia at the 2016 Rio Paralympics.

Personal
Calati was born on 12 October 1986. At motorcycle accident in 2006 led to the amputation of her right leg. In 2014, she  was working four days a week for a landscaping business as a gardener.

Wheelchair tennis
Her prosthetist recommended she take up sport and this led to a meeting with national wheelchair tennis coach Greg Crump in 2009.
Calati made her international debut in 2012 at the BNP Paribas World Team Cup in India.
, her singles ranking is 59 and her best ranking was 29 on 14 December 2015. She was allocated a place in the 2016 Rio Paralympics after Russia was suspended from the Games .

At the 2016 Rio Paralympics, Calati lost to Zhu Zhenzhen (CHN) 0-2 (0–6, 1–6) in the first round of the Women's Singles.

References

External links
 
 
 
 

1986 births
Living people
Australian female tennis players
Australian gardeners
Australian wheelchair tennis players
Paralympic wheelchair tennis players of Australia
Wheelchair tennis players at the 2016 Summer Paralympics
Wheelchair category Paralympic competitors
Sportswomen from Victoria (Australia)
Tennis players from Melbourne
21st-century Australian people